The 18501/18502 Visakhapatnam – Gandhidham Express is an Express train belonging to Indian Railways that runs between Visakhapatnam Junction and Gandhidham Junction as a weekly service. It is maintained by South Coast Railway Zone.

Special runs and inaugural

It operates as train number 18501 from Visakhapatnam to Gandhidham and as train number 18502. It first ran as holiday special on 19, 26 December 2013. Later it was inaugurated on 24 December by Union minister of state for commerce and industry, D.Purandeswari with train number as 08503 from Visakhapatnam and from Gandhidham as 08504 inaugural special. Its regular run commenced on 2 January 2014 with train numbers 18501/18502.

Coach Composition

The train has standard ICF rakes with max speed of 110 kmph. The train consists of 23 coaches :

 1 AC II Tier
 3 AC III Tier
 10 Sleeper Coaches
 6 General Unreserved
 2 Seating cum Luggage Rake
 1 Pantry Car

Service

The 18501/Visakhapatnam - Gandhidham Express has an average speed of 54 km/hr and covers 2112 km in 39 hrs 25 mins.

The 18502/Gandhidham - Visakhapatnam Express has an average speed of 53 km/hr and covers 2112 km in 39 hrs 50 mins.

Route and halts 

The halts of the train are:

Schedule

Direction Reversal

Train reverses its direction one time at:

Traction

It is hauled by an Electric Loco Shed, Vadodara or Electric Loco Shed, Lallaguda based WAP-4E or WAP-7 from Visakhapatnam to Ahmedabad, after which a Diesel Loco Shed, Vatva based WDM-3A or WDM-3D takes over until Gandhidham.

References

Express trains in India
Rail transport in Gujarat
Rail transport in Andhra Pradesh
Transport in Visakhapatnam
Transport in Gandhidham
Rail transport in Telangana
Rail transport in Maharashtra
Railway services introduced in 2013